"Unconditional" a song recorded by American singer-songwriter Ne-Yo for his fifth studio album R.E.D. (2012). It was written by Ne-Yo, Allen Arthur, Clayton Reilly and Keith Justice; the latter three also produced the song under their production moniker, Phatboiz. "Unconditional" picks up on the same themes of romance. On this song, Ne-Yo sings with ambient vocals.

Harrison Craig version

In 2013, Harrison Craig, winner of the second series of The Voice in Australia, recorded a version of the song for his debut album More than a Dream. On 18 June 2013, "Unconditional" was released as Craig's first single.

Live performance 
Craig first performed the song on the series' grand final after he was declared the winner.

Release history

References

2013 singles
Pop ballads
2012 songs
Songs written by Ne-Yo
Universal Music Group singles